Mission City Roller Derby is a women's flat track roller derby league based in Santa Barbara, California. Founded in 2009, Mission City is a member of the Women's Flat Track Derby Association (WFTDA).

History
Mission City Roller Derby was founded in 2009. The league's A-team, the Brawlin' Betties, competed in their first home bout on July 18, 2009 against the Ventura County Derby Darlins.

Mission City Roller Derby became a 501(c)(3) non-profit organization in 2013. 

The league entered the WFTDA Apprentice Program in January 2015, and was made a full member in September of the same year.

References

Roller derby leagues established in 2009
Roller derby leagues in California
Sports in Santa Barbara County, California
2009 establishments in California